Ypsolopha albistriatus is a moth of the family Ypsolophidae. It is found in Japan and Russia.

The wingspan is 24–26 mm.

References

Ypsolophidae
Moths of Japan
Moths of Asia